Michael James Barry (born 22 May 1953) is a former professional footballer midfielder. Barry was born in Hull, East Riding of Yorkshire, England.

Barry played for Huddersfield Town, Carlisle United and Bristol Rovers in England before moving to the United States to play for the Columbus Magic of the American Soccer League. In 1975, he played on loan from Carlisle United to the Washington Diplomats of the North American Soccer League. Barry began the 1979–80 Major Indoor Soccer League with  the Pittsburgh Spirit, but moved to the Cleveland Force after three games. He remained with the Force through the 1980–81 season and the beginning of the 1981–82 season. The Force sent Barry to the New Jersey Rockets midway through the season. Even with his move indoors, Barry continued to play outdoor soccer. In 1979, he joined the Columbus Magic of the second division American Soccer League. In 1980 and 1981, he played for the Cleveland Cobras, also of the ASL. Barry finished his career with the Columbus Capitals of the minor league American Indoor Soccer Association.

References

1953 births
Living people
American Indoor Soccer Association players
American Soccer League (1933–1983) players
Bristol Rovers F.C. players
Carlisle United F.C. players
Cleveland Cobras players
Cleveland Force (original MISL) players
Columbus Capitals players
Columbus Magic players
English expatriate footballers
English expatriate sportspeople in the United States
English footballers
Welsh footballers
Wales under-23 international footballers
Expatriate soccer players in the United States
Association football midfielders
Huddersfield Town A.F.C. players
Major Indoor Soccer League (1978–1992) players
New Jersey Rockets (MISL) players
North American Soccer League (1968–1984) players
Pittsburgh Spirit players
Footballers from Kingston upon Hull
Washington Diplomats (NASL) players
Welsh expatriate sportspeople in the United States
Welsh expatriate footballers